Vid Fašaić (6 June 1911 – 11 April 2003) was a Croatian rower. He competed in the men's double sculls event at the 1936 Summer Olympics.

References

External links
 

1911 births
2003 deaths
Croatian male rowers
Olympic rowers of Yugoslavia
Rowers at the 1936 Summer Olympics
Place of birth missing